Principality of Terebovlia was a Kievan Rus principality established as an appanage principality ca 1084 and was given to Vasylko Rostyslavych (his brothers, Volodar Rostyslavych and Rurik Rostislavich, ruled Peremyshl (Przemyśl) and Zvenyhorod respectively).

History

A southeastern appanage principality of Kievan Rus, the capital of which was Terebovlia. Its territories included parts of southeastern Galicia, Bukovina, and western Podolia. It bordered on Kiev principality to the east, Zvenyhorod principality to the west, and parts of Principality of Volodymyr, Lutsk principality, and Peresopnytsia principality to the north. 

Vasylko Rostyslavych extensively colonized the territories southeast of Terebovlia by employing Turkic peoples (Berendeys, Torks, and Pechenegs), and he annexed Ponyzia, thereby securing it against nomadic raiders. Halych gained importance as a political and economic center; other important cities and fortresses included Terebovlia, Mykulyn (now Mykulyntsi), Chern (now Chernivtsi), Vasyliv (Bukovina), Onut, Kuchelemyn, Bakota, Ushytsia, and Kalius. After Vasylko Rostyslavych's death in 1124, Halych principality seceded, and by 1141 Terebovlia principality had become a part of the Principality of Halych. After the Rostyslavych dynasty died out, it was briefly an appanage principality under Iziaslav Volodymyrovych.

Princes
Vasylko Rostyslavych (1084–1124)
Rostyslav-Hryhoriy Vasylkovich (1124–1141)
Iziaslav Volodymyrovych (1210–1211)

See also
 Council of Liubech

References
(In Ukrainian) Леонтій Войтович. Князівські династії Східної Європи (кінець IX — початок XVI ст.): склад, суспільна і політична роль. Історико-генеалогічне дослідження
(In Ukrainian) Іван Крип’якевич. Галицько-Волинське князівство

External links
Terebovlia principality in Encyclopedia of Ukraine, vol. 5 (1993).  (Encyclopedia of Ukraine)

Terebovlia
Terebovlia
Terebovlia
Terebovlia
States and territories established in the 1080s
States and territories disestablished in the 1140s
Terebovlia